is a railway station where the Nishitetsu Kaizuka Line and the JR Kashii Line meet in Higashi-ku, Fukuoka, Japan.

Adjacent Stations

Lines 
 Kyushu Railway Company (JR Kyushu)
 Kashii Line
 Nishi-Nippon Railroad (Nishitetsu)
 Kaizuka Line

Station layout

JR Wajiro Station 
The station is above ground level with an island platform and two tracks.

Tracks

Nishitetsu Wajiro Station 
The station is above ground level with two side platforms serving a track each.

Tracks

Railway stations in Japan opened in 1905
Railway stations in Fukuoka Prefecture